The Philosopher's Annual (PA) is an annual selection of ten best papers in philosophy. It takes as its goal "to select the ten best articles published in philosophy each year—an attempt as simple to state as it is admittedly impossible to fulfill". It is published annually since 1978.  The editor is Patrick Grim, and he is joined each year by Ph.D. students in philosophy from the University of Michigan in making the final selections.

References

External links

Philosophy awards
1978 establishments in the United States
Philosophy journals
Publications established in 1978
Annual journals
English-language journals